Sigismund's Chapel is a royal chapel of the Wawel Cathedral in Kraków, Poland. Built as a funerary chapel for the last members of the Jagiellonian Dynasty, it has been hailed by many art historians as "the most beautiful example of the Tuscan Renaissance north of the Alps". Financed by King Sigismund I the Old, it was built in 1519–33 by Italian architect Bartolomeo Berrecci.

A square-based chapel with a golden dome houses the tombs of its founder King Sigismund, as well as King Sigismund II Augustus and Anna Jagiellon. The inner sculptures, stuccos and paintings were designed by some of the most renowned artists of the age, including the architect Berrecci himself, Georg Pencz, Santi Gucci and Hermann Vischer.

Gallery

See also
 Renaissance architecture
 Renaissance in Poland
 Jagiellon dynasty
 History of early modern period domes

References

External links

 

Religious buildings and structures completed in 1533
16th-century Roman Catholic church buildings in Poland
Roman Catholic churches in Kraków
Church buildings with domes
1533 establishments in Europe
Roman Catholic chapels in Poland
Royal chapels
16th-century establishments in Poland